Tjokorda Krishna Putra Sudharsana (born 1956) is a famous Balinese artist and the current prince of Ubud.

External links
Indonesia - Bali First Foreign Correspondent - October 25, 2005
Krishna Sudharsana- Klub Kokos

1956 births
Indonesian Hindus
Indonesian artists
Living people
Monarchs of Bali
Balinese people
Date of birth missing (living people)